Bilafond La (meaning "Pass of the Butterflies" in Balti language, also known as the Saltoro Pass, is a mountain pass situated on Saltoro Ridge, sitting immediately west of the vast Siachen Glacier, some  directly north of map point NJ 980420 which defined the end of the 1972 Line of Control between Pakistan and India as part of the Simla Agreement. Bilafond La is on the ancient Silk Route linking the Indian Subcontinent and China.

Bilafond La was a prominent feature during the 1984 start of military action in the Siachen Conflict between India and Pakistan. The Indian Army captured the pass in 1984 along with Sia La to the north and, in 1987, Gyong La to the south. India currently maintains a fortified military base at Bilafond La.

Geopolitical issues

Bilafond Pass, as well as nearby passes Sia La and Gyong La, were scenes of military activity starting in 1984 during Operation Meghdoot, part of the Siachen Conflict, itself being part of the larger Kashmir Conflict. Due to the strategic location of the pass west of the Siachen Glacier and near the current Actual Ground Position Line between India and Pakistan, the Indian Army maintains a presence to defend their position.

See also

 Near the AGPL (Actual Ground Position Line)
 NJ9842, LoC ends and AGPL begins
 Gyong La
 Chumik Glacier
 Saltoro Mountains
 Saltoro Kangri
 Ghent Kangri
 Sia La
 Indira Col

 Borders
 Actual Ground Position Line (AGPL)
 India–Pakistan International Border {IB)
 Line of Control {LoC)
 Line of Actual Control (LAC)
 Sir Creek (SC)
 Borders of China
 Borders of India
 Borders of Pakistan

 Conflicts
 Kashmir conflict
 Siachen conflict
 Sino-Indian conflict
 List of disputed territories of China
 List of disputed territories of India
 List of disputed territories of Pakistan
 Northern Areas
 Trans-Karakoram Tract

 Operations
 Operation Meghdoot, by India
 Operation Rajiv, by India
 Operation Safed Sagar, by India

 Other related topics
 Awards and decorations of the Indian Armed Forces
 Bana Singh, after whom Quaid Post was renamed to Bana Top 
 Dafdar, westernmost town in Trans-Karakoram Tract
 India-China Border Roads
 List of extreme points of India
 Sino-Pakistan Agreement for transfer of Trans-Karakoram Tract to China

Notes

References

External links
 Siachen Peace Park

Mountain passes of Ladakh
Mountain passes of India
Mountain passes of the Himalayas
Mountain passes of the Karakoram